Coração is the Portuguese word for "heart".

Places
Brazil
Coração de Jesus, municipality in the state of Minas Gerais
Coração de Maria, municipality in the state of Bahia

Portugal
Coração de Jesus (Lisbon), former civil parish (freguesia) in the municipality of Lisbon
Coração de Jesus Basilica, Jesuit basilica in Póvoa de Varzim, Portugal

In culture
Caminhos do Coração, 2008 Brazilian telenovela
Insensato Coração, 2011 Brazilian telenovela 
Coração de Gaúcho, 1920 Brazilian silent drama film 
Coração do Brasil, a 2013 Brazilian documentary film 
Coração d'Ouro, a 2015 Portuguese soap